GLAA may refer to:

Gay and Lesbian Activists Alliance, a not-for-profit organization based in Washington, D.C., United States  
Greater Los Angeles Area, a term for the urbanized area around the county of Los Angeles, California, United States
Great Lakes Adventist Academy, a Seventh-day Adventist boarding school in Cedar Lake, Michigan, United States
Gangmasters and Labour Abuse Authority, a non-departmental public body in the United Kingdom